The Ceair is a right tributary of the river Almălău in Romania. It discharges into Lake Bugeac in Gârlița.

References

Rivers of Romania
Rivers of Constanța County